The Furnace is a lost 1920 American silent drama film directed by William Desmond Taylor, written by Julia Crawford Ivers based upon the 1920 novel of the same name by Leslie Beresford. It was distributed by Realart Pictures.

Cast
Agnes Ayres as Folly Vallance
Jerome Patrick as Anthony Bond
Theodore Roberts as General Archibald Foulkes-Brent
Betty Francisco as Patricia Brent
Milton Sills as Keene Mordaunt
Helen Dunbar as Lady Foulkes-Brent
F. A. Turner as Albert Vallance (credited as Fred Turner)
Mayme Kelso as Mrs. Vallance
Lucien Littlefield as Bert Vallance
Robert Bolder as Solomon Bassbridge
Edward Martindel as Count Svenson

References

External links

1920 films
American silent feature films
Films directed by William Desmond Taylor
Lost American films
1920 drama films
Silent American drama films
American black-and-white films
1920s English-language films
1920 lost films
Lost drama films
1920s American films